The Guerrillas of Destiny, sometimes shortened to G.O.D., is a professional wrestling stable which consists of the Tongan-American brothers Tama Tonga, Tanga Loa, Hikuleo and manager Jado. Tama and Tanga originally began wrestling together in 2008 under the team name Sons of Tonga, a reference to their father, professional wrestler Tonga Fifita. After a seven-year break, the team reunited in March 2016, when Loa joined Tonga in New Japan Pro-Wrestling (NJPW), where they are a record seven time IWGP Tag Team Champions.

From 2016 to 2022, they were members of the Bullet Club stable, they are the former three-time NEVER Openweight 6-Man Tag Team Champions with various Bullet Club teammates. In March 2022, during the New Japan Cup; Tonga, Loa, and Jado were removed from Bullet Club and the Guerrillas of Destiny became a stable in NJPW with Jado joining the group. They also appear in the U.S. based promotion Ring of Honor (ROH) and Impact Wrestling, where they are former ROH World Tag Team Champions, making them overall eight-time World Tag Team Champions between NJPW and ROH.

History

Training and early career (2008–2009) 
Alipate Leone and Tevita Fifita are sons of professional wrestler Tonga Fifita, better known by the ring names Haku, Meng and King Tonga. The two brothers grew up together in Central Florida, but did not immediately gravitate to their father's profession. They finally decided to pursue their own careers in professional wrestling, when Alipate was stationed at Whiteman Air Force Base with the United States Air Force and Tevita was attending University of Texas at El Paso. The brothers started training under their father and Ricky Santana in a ring owned by the Dudley Boyz (Bubba Ray Dudley and D-Von Dudley) at their Team 3D Academy of Professional Wrestling and Sports Entertainment training school in Kissimmee, Florida. Eventually the brothers signed up with the Team 3D Academy, where they would continue their training for a year under the Dudley Boyz.

In 2008, Alipate and Tevita began wrestling under the names Kava and Nuku, respectively, and the team name "Sons of Tonga". In 2009, the brothers took part in a WWE tryout camp, which resulted in Tevita being signed to a contract. Tevita eventually made it to WWE television under the ring name "Camacho", while Alipate traveled first to Puerto Rico and then to Japan, joining New Japan Pro-Wrestling (NJPW) in May 2010, where he became a founding member of the Bullet Club stable in 2013 as "Tama Tonga".

New Japan Pro-Wrestling (2016–present) 

On February 14, 2016, at NJPW's The New Beginning in Niigata event, Bullet Club's Doc Gallows and Karl Anderson unsuccessfully challenged G • B • H (Togi Makabe and Tomoaki Honma) for the IWGP Tag Team Championship. Following the match, Gallows and Anderson's stablemate Tama Tonga, entered the ring to challenge Makabe and Honma, stating that his partner would be a new Bullet Club member. The challenge was accepted by Makabe and Honma. On March 12, Tonga revealed that his partner would be his brother Tevita, who was given the ring name "Tanga Loa" with their tag team dubbed "Guerrillas of Destiny" (G.O.D.). The brothers together came up with their team name, which references their feeling of "fighting for a cause" and the belief that destiny had brought them back together. The team's acronym stemmed from Alipate's ring name meaning "God of War" and Tevita's ring name meaning "Family of God" in the Polynesian Islands.

Loa made his NJPW debut on March 27, attacking Togi Makabe during his match with Tonga. This led to his first match with the promotion on April 1, where the Bullet Club quintet of Loa, Tonga, Bad Luck Fale, Kenny Omega and Yujiro Takahashi were defeated by Makabe, Tomoaki Honma, Juice Robinson, Hiroshi Tanahashi and Michael Elgin in a ten-man elimination tag team match. On April 10 at Invasion Attack 2016, G.O.D. defeated G.B.H. to become the new IWGP Tag Team Champions. They made their first successful title defense on May 3 at Wrestling Dontaku 2016, defeating G.B.H. in a rematch. Later that month, G.O.D. took part in a North American tour, co-promoted by NJPW and the American Ring of Honor (ROH) promotion. During the War of the Worlds event on May 14, ROH wrestler Jay Briscoe pinned Loa to win an eight-man tag team match between Team ROH and Bullet Club and afterwards announced that he and his brother Mark were coming to NJPW to take the IWGP Tag Team Championship from Loa and Tonga. On June 8, NJPW officially announced that the win had earned the Briscoe Brothers a shot at the IWGP Tag Team Championship. The title match took place on June 19 at Dominion 6.19 in Osaka-jo Hall and saw the Briscoe Brothers end G.O.D.'s title reign and become the new champions.

On September 22 at Destruction in Hiroshima, after the Briscoe Brothers had successfully defended the IWGP Tag Team Championship against Bullet Club's The Young Bucks (Matt Jackson and Nick Jackson), they were attacked by G.O.D., who demanded a title rematch. This led to a match on October 10 at King of Pro-Wrestling, where G.O.D. defeated the Briscoe Brothers to regain the IWGP Tag Team Championship. Following the match, G.O.D. and The Young Bucks attacked the Briscoe Brothers as well as Tomohiro Ishii, who tried to save the former champions. This led directly to G.O.D.'s first title defense on November 5 at Power Struggle, where they defeated Ishii and Yoshi-Hashi. From November 18 to December 10, G.O.D. took part in the 2016 World Tag League. After winning their block with a record of six wins and one loss, G.O.D. advanced to the finals of the tournament, where they were defeated by G.B.H., setting up another title match between the two teams. However, before the match could take place at Wrestle Kingdom 11 in Tokyo Dome, G.O.D.'s title belts were stolen by Toru Yano, which resulted in him and Tomohiro Ishii being added to the match. On January 4, 2017, at Wrestle Kingdom 11 in Tokyo Dome, G.O.D. lost the IWGP Tag Team Championship to Yano and Ishii in the three-way match. The match became infamous for the excessive loud cursing in English by Tonga and Loa. This was the result of their mother telling them that they needed to stand out at the "WrestleMania of New Japan Pro Wrestling". On June 11 at Dominion 6.11 in Osaka-jo Hall, G.O.D. defeated War Machine (Hanson and Raymond Rowe) to win the IWGP Tag Team Championship for the third time. They lost the title back to War Machine in a no disqualification match on July 1 at G1 Special in USA.

In September, Guerrillas of Destiny, War Machine and the Killer Elite Squad (Davey Boy Smith Jr. and Lance Archer) were booked in three three-way matches for the IWGP Tag Team Championship. The first two matches on September 10 at Destruction in Fukushima and September 16 at Destruction in Hiroshima were won by War Machine, while the third match, contested under tornado tag team match rules, on September 24 at Destruction in Kobe was won by the Killer Elite Squad. In December, Guerrillas of Destiny won their block in the 2017 World Tag League with a record of five wins and two losses, advancing to the finals of the tournament. On December 11, they were defeated in the finals of the tournament by Los Ingobernables de Japón (Evil and Sanada). Six days later, Guerrillas of Destiny and Bad Luck Fale defeated Sanada, Evil and Bushi to become the new NEVER Openweight 6-Man Tag Team Champions. They lost the title to Chaos (Beretta, Tomohiro Ishii and Toru Yano) in a five-team gauntlet match on January 4, 2018, at Wrestle Kingdom 12 in Tokyo Dome.

The Guerrillas spent the bulk of 2018 being embroiled in the Bullet Club civil war, as part of the OG faction of the group, feuding with the Elite faction. The Elite would ultimately separate from Bullet Club, and G.O.D. would remain with the new streamlined Bullet Club under new leader Jay White. On August 12 during the G1 Climax event, G.O.D. won their third NEVER Openweight 6-Man Title, this time teaming with Bullet Club teammate Taiji Ishimori, and would hold the championships until January 30, 2019, losing them to Taguchi Japan at a Road to New Beginning event.

On February 23, 2019, they would regain the IWGP Heavyweight Tag Team Titles by defeating Sanada & Evil at Honor Rising 2019: Day 2, starting their fifth reign. On April 6, 2019, G.O.D. won a Winner Take All Fatal Four-Way tag team match at G1 Supercard, successfully defending the IWGP titles and winning the ROH World Tag Team Championship for the first time, making them double champions between NJPW and ROH. They would lose the titles against The Briscoes at Manhattan Mayhem. After defending the IWGP Tag Team Championships another six times, their reign would end when G.O.D lost to FinJuice (Juice Robinson & David Finlay) at Wrestle Kingdom 14. They would soon immediately regain the belts at The New Beginning in the USA event in Atlanta, before again losing them without a defence to Golden*Ace (Hiroshi Tanahashi & Kota Ibushi) on a New Japan Road show in Korakuen Hall.

After the 2020 Pandemic, Guerrillas of Destiny would make their return to Japan as participants of the World Tag League. They would win the tournament for the first time after defeating FinJuice in the finals. They would go on to win an IWGP Tag Team Titles at Wrestle Kingdom 15, defeating champions Dangerous Tekkers (Taichi & Zack Sabre Jr.) after Tanga Loa hit 'Apeshit' (a Sitout Reverse Piledriver) on Taichi after 19 minutes & 18 seconds. They retained the championships against Dangerous Tekkers in a rematch at The New Beginning in Hiroshima. They retained the championships again at Castle Attack, defeating Chaos's Hirooki Goto and Yoshi-Hashi. On June 1, they lost the IWGP Tag Team Championships back to the Dangerous Tekkers at the Road to Dominion. 

The Guerrillas of Destiny made a surprise appearance at NJPW Resurgence where they confronted former Bullet Club stablemates The Good Brothers (Karl Anderson and Doc Gallows). The Guerillas returned to Japan to compete in the World Tag League in November, however, failed to advance to the finals after only scoring 14 points in the tournament.

Impact Wrestling (2022) 
On the January 27, 2022, episode of Impact!, Guerrillas of Destiny made their Impact Wrestling debut attacking Jake Something and Mike Bailey before challenging The Good Brothers to a match at No Surrender for the Impact World Tag Team Championship.
At No Surrender, Jay White interfered in G.O.D's match against The Good Brothers, hitting the Blade Runner on Tama Tonga causing them to lose the match. Afterwards, Jay White, Chris Bey, Anderson and Gallows all gave the "Too Sweet" hand gesture in the middle of the ring, signaling that G.O.D. had been traded out of Bullet Club in favor of The Good Brothers.

Members

Current

Championships and accomplishments 
 New Japan Pro-Wrestling
 IWGP Tag Team Championship (7 times)
 NEVER Openweight 6-Man Tag Team Championship (3 times) – with Bad Luck Fale (2) and Taiji Ishimori (1)
 NEVER Openweight Championship (2 times, current) – Tonga
 World Tag League (2020)
 Pro Wrestling Illustrated
 Ranked Tonga No. 94 of the top 500 singles wrestlers in the PWI 500 in 2019
 Ranked Loa No. 97 of the top 500 singles wrestlers in the PWI 500 in 2019
 Ranked No. 6 of the top 50 Tag Teams in the PWI Tag Team 50 in 2020
 Ring of Honor
 ROH World Tag Team Championship (1 time)
 WrestleCircus
 WC Big Top Tag Team Championship (1 time)

Notes

References

External links 

Bullet Club members
Consejo Mundial de Lucha Libre teams and stables
Impact Wrestling teams and stables
Independent promotions teams and stables
New Japan Pro-Wrestling teams and stables
Ring of Honor teams and stables
Sibling duos